Elizabeth Smith-McCrossin (born September 7, 1969) is a Canadian politician. She was elected to the Nova Scotia House of Assembly in the 2017 provincial election. She is an Independent member and represents the electoral district of Cumberland North.

Early life and education
Smith-McCrossin was born and raised on a dairy farm in Linden, Nova Scotia. She graduated from Dalhousie University in 1991 with a bachelor of science in nursing. She earned an executive MBA from Saint Mary's University in 2013.

Politics
Smith-McCrossin was elected to the Nova Scotia House of Assembly in the 2017 provincial election. She was a member of the Progressive Conservative party until ousted on June 24, 2021, for failing to accept responsibility and apologize for her role in an illegal blockade of the Trans-Canada Highway.

Smith-McCrossin launched a bid for the leadership of the PC Party of Nova Scotia on February 6, 2018. Her leadership campaign was co-chaired by Halifax-businessman Rob Batherson and former Member of Parliament Scott Armstrong. She lost to Tim Houston.

Smith-McCrossin was re-elected as an Independent in the 2021 provincial election. Smith-McCrossin’s victory in Cumberland North marked the first occasion since 1988 that an independent candidate won election to the legislature.

Controversies

In July 2018, Smith-McCrossin was criticized when a former constituency office employee spoke out against the way she was treated while working for her. After the issue was reviewed by the Nova Scotia Human Rights commission, the complaint was deemed uncredible.

In February 2020, during the 2020 Canadian pipeline and railway protests, McCrossin tweeted: “The rail blockades must be removed today. Businesses are being affected in Cumberland North and layoffs are coming soon for many if they are not removed immediately,” said the MLA at the time, calling those blockades “illegal”.

On June 22, 2021, Smith-McCrossin incited and participated in a blockade of the Trans-Canada Highway in protest to the ongoing closures of the border. The protest was held at exit 7, 43 kilometres from the border on an off ramp. This led to her being kicked out of the Progressive Conservative caucus and barred from running for the party in future elections. Nova Scotia Progressive Conservative leader Tim Houston said "As colleagues for the past four years, I owed her an opportunity to explain her actions, and the efforts she took to conceal those actions from her caucus colleagues. Unfortunately, Ms. Smith-McCrossin refused to acknowledge any wrongdoing and — when explicitly asked by her caucus — refused to apologize to Nova Scotians."

Electoral record

References

Dalhousie University alumni
Living people
People from Amherst, Nova Scotia
Progressive Conservative Association of Nova Scotia MLAs
Saint Mary's University (Halifax) alumni
Women MLAs in Nova Scotia
21st-century Canadian politicians
21st-century Canadian women politicians
1969 births